Ethiopia competed at the 2009 World Championships in Athletics from 15 to 23 August. A team of 38 athletes competed after achieving one of the competition's qualifying standards. The squad composed of middle and long distance specialists featured three reigning world champions: Meseret Defar (5000 m), Tirunesh Dibaba (10,000 m), and Kenenisa Bekele (10,000 m).  Because a champion is given a bye into the championships, Ethiopia was permitted to enter an extra athlete in those events, and the Ethiopian Athletics Federation also picked a reserve athlete in these events.

Team selection

Results

Men

Women

References

External links

Nations at the 2009 World Championships in Athletics
World Championships in Athletics
Ethiopia at the World Championships in Athletics